Luise Ullrich (31 October 1910 – 21 January 1985) was an Austrian actress.

She was born in Vienna. While still a teenager, she got a stage contract. In late 1932, Ullrich played opposite Werner Krauss in "Rauhnacht" in Berlin. In 1933, she performed with Hans Jaray in Leise flehen meine Lieder (Lover Divine, in English). During one of her performances, she was spotted by actor and filmmaker Luis Trenker, who cast her in the leading role of Erika in Der Rebell (1932). It launched her film career, as she moved to higher-profile roles. Louis B. Mayer offered her a contract at MGM in 1938, which Louise declined. By 1941, for Annelie, she earned for the film studio Ufa the then record sum of 6.5 million Reichsmark and garnered Ullrich the Coppa Volpi award in Venice. She won the Volpi Cup for Best Actress at the 1941 Venice Film Festival. In South America, she met her future husband, Count Wulf Dietrich zu Castell, director of Munich-Riem airport.

After a string of films, she was reduced to appearing on TV in the 1960s. In 1973, she published her memoirs. She spent most of her remaining years writing and painting. She appeared in nearly 50 films between 1932 and 1981. She died of cancer in January 1985.

Filmography

References

External links
 
 Luise Ullrich at Virtual History

1910 births
1985 deaths
20th-century Austrian actresses
Actresses from Vienna
Austrian film actresses
Austrian television actresses
Volpi Cup for Best Actress winners